Cara Black and Alexandra Fusai were the defending champions but they competed with different partners that year, Black with Sandrine Testud and Fusai with Rita Grande.

Black and Testud lost in the semifinals to Emmanuelle Gagliardi and Barbara Schett.

Fusai and Grande won in the final 7–6 (7–4), 6–3 against Gagliardi and Schett.

Seeds
Champion seeds are indicated in bold text while text in italics indicates the round in which those seeds were eliminated.

 Cara Black /  Sandrine Testud (semifinals)
 Liezel Horn /  Paola Suárez (semifinals)
 Alexandra Fusai /  Rita Grande (champions)
 Tina Križan /  Katarina Srebotnik (quarterfinals)

Draw

Qualifying

Seeds
  Amanda Augustus /  Amy Jensen (second round)
  Haruka Inoue /  Maiko Inoue (Qualifiers)

Qualifiers
  Haruka Inoue /  Maiko Inoue

Draw
 NB: The first two rounds used the pro set format.

References
 2001 ASB Classic Doubles Draw

WTA Auckland Open
2001 WTA Tour